Rodrigo Zuazola (born: 9 March 1957) is a sailor from Chile. who represented his country at the 1988 Summer Olympics in Busan, South Korea as crew member in the Soling. With helmsman Germán Schacht and fellow crew members Manuel Gonzalez they took the 20th place.

References

Living people
1959 births
Sailors at the 1984 Summer Olympics – Star
Sailors at the 1988 Summer Olympics – Soling
Olympic sailors of Chile
Chilean male sailors (sport)